"Battle of Who Could Care Less" is a song performed by Ben Folds Five, released as part of their 1997 album Whatever and Ever Amen, written by Ben Folds. It peaked at #26 in the UK Singles Chart, and enjoyed widespread radio airplay in the summer of 1997 in the UK, with the music video being regularly shown on both MTV and VH1.

Track listing
"Battle of Who Could Care Less" - 3:17
"Hava Nagila" - 1:33
"For Those of Y'all Who Wear Fanny Packs" - 6:05

References

External links
Lyrics at BenFoldsFive.com

1997 singles
Ben Folds Five songs
Songs written by Ben Folds
1997 songs